William Jefferies (christened 1 July 1777; date of death unknown) or William Jeffries, was an English cricketer. He was active through the years 1800–1818 when he played for Nottingham Cricket Club. He was christened in Nottingham in July 1777.

1800–1803
Jefferies is first recorded in Nottingham's match at Leicester against Leicester Cricket Club on 25 August 1800. Nottingham won by an innings and 38 runs after dismissing Leicester for totals of 15 and 8. Nottingham were all out for 61 in their first innings. Jefferies was number 9 in the batting order and was run out for 3. Five weeks later, on 29 September, Jefferies played against Sheffield Cricket Club at Mansfield. He batted at number 10 and scored 1 in each innings. Nottingham scored 67 and 102 against 24 and 22 by Sheffield to win by 123 runs.

Jefferies appeared in a minor match for Nottingham in 1801 and in 1803 played at Lord's for a combined Nottinghamshire and Leicestershire team against a Hampshire side. Jefferies batted at number 8, scoring 4 and 2 in a heavy defeat for the combined side. This is the only match Jefferies played in which has been considered to have first-class cricket status.

1814–1818
There is no further mention of Jefferies until 1814 when he played for Nottingham against Rutlandshire at Burley Park on 20 September. Jefferies, batting at number 8, top-scored with 67. He is known to have played once in 1815 when he played in a minor match on 4 October against a village team who were allowed sixteen players. Nottingham still won by 4 wickets. Jefferies made two low scores and held one catch. Nottingham travelled to Knavesmire in July 1816 for a 12-a-side match against the Ripon club.

In June 1817, Nottingham entertained an England XI on the Forest Ground, fielding 22 players in an "odds match". Jefferies scored 2 and 5 and although Nottingham won the match became the cause of a major scandal, with implications of attempts by both sides to fix the result. The final match he is known to have played in is a repeat of the same match September 1818. Jefferies scored 6 in the first innings but did not bat in the second as Nottingham won by 14 wickets.

Notes

References

Sources

External links

1777 births
Year of death unknown
English cricketers
English cricketers of 1787 to 1825
Cricketers from Nottingham